Culex thriambus is a mosquito species that appears in the southwestern United States, including Southern California, Texas, as well as in Mexico. It is a confirmed vector of West Nile virus. The majority of host species the mosquito takes blood from are in the order Passeriformes.

References

thriambus
Insects described in 1921
Diptera of North America
Insects of Mexico
Fauna of California
Fauna of the Southwestern United States